Pisacoma (from Aymara P'isaq Uma) is one of seven districts of the  Chucuito Province in Peru.

Geography 
Other mountains are listed below:

Ethnic groups 
The people in the district are mainly indigenous citizens of Aymara descent. Aymara is the language which the majority of the population (51.30%) learnt to speak in childhood, 48.08% of the residents started speaking using the Spanish language (2007 Peru Census).

References